Gura Bîcului  is a commune and village in the Anenii Noi District of the Republic of Moldova. The Gura Bîcului bridge on the Dniester river was blown up on 5 May 1992 during the war. It was later rebuilt by the Organization for Security and Co-operation in Europe, using European Union funds, as part of the so-called Berlin Plus package. The Gura Bîcului bridge was officially opened to the traffic on 18 November 2017.

References

Communes of Anenii Noi District
Populated places on the Dniester